Simple commodity production, also known as petty commodity production, is a term coined by Friedrich Engels to describe productive activities under the conditions of what Karl Marx had called the "simple exchange" of commodities, where independent producers trade their own products. The use of the word simple does not refer to the nature of the producers or of their production, but rather to the relatively simple and straightforward exchange processes involved.

Origins 
Simple exchange of commodities is as old as the history of trade, insofar as it has progressed beyond barter, and occurred for thousands of years before most production became organised in the capitalist way. It begins when producers in a simple division of labour (e.g. farmers and artisans) trade surpluses to their own requirements, with the aim of obtaining other products with an equal value, for their own use. Through the experience of trade, regular exchange values become established for products, which reflect an economy of labour-time.

Engels argued explicitly that the Marxian law of value applied also to simple exchange, this law being modified in the capitalist mode of production when all the inputs and outputs of production (including means of production and labour power) become tradeable commodities. This interpretation is however not accepted by all Marxists, some of whom see capitalist markets as functioning in a completely different way from pre-capitalist markets. Engels aimed to give a consistent explanation of the evolution and development of market economy from simple beginnings to the complexities of modern capitalist markets, but some argue he disregards the transformation of the relations of production involved.

Relations of production 
Simple commodity production is compatible with many different relations of production, ranging from self-employment where the producer owns his means of production, and family labour, to forms of slavery, peonage, indentured labour, and serfdom. The simple commodity producer could aim just to trade his products for others with an equivalent value, or he could aim to realise a profit.

That is to say, simple commodity production is not specific to any particular mode of production, and might be found in many different modes of production, with various degrees of sophistication. It does not necessarily imply that all inputs or outputs of productive activity are commodities traded in markets. Thus, for example, simple commodity producers could produce some products for their own use on their own land, while trading another part of their products. They might buy or trade some tools and equipment, but also make some themselves.

From simple commodity production to capitalist production 
The large-scale transformation of simple commodity production into capitalist production based on the wage labour of employees occurred only in the last two centuries of human history. It is preceded by the strong growth of merchant trade, supported by financiers who earn rents, profit and interest from the process. The merchants not only act as intermediary between producers and consumers, but also integrate more and more of production into a market economy. That is, more and more is produced for the purpose of market trade, rather than for own use. The initial result is known as "merchant capitalism", which flourished in Western European cities in the 17th and 18th century.

However, the transformation from simple commodity production into capitalist production accompanying industrialisation requires profound changes in property relations, because it must be possible to trade freely in means of production and labour power (the factors of production). Only when that trade becomes possible, can the whole of production be reorganised to conform to commercial principles. Marx describes capitalist society as "a society where the commodity-form is the universal form of the product of labour, hence the dominant social relation is the relation between men as possessors of commodities". He argues that "The capitalist epoch is... characterized by the fact that labour-power, in the eyes of the worker himself, takes on the form of a commodity which is his property; his labour consequently takes on the form of wage-labour... it is only from this moment that the commodity-form of the products of labour becomes universal." Thus, "...from the moment there is a free sale, by the worker himself, of labour power as a commodity... from then onwards... commodity production is generalized and becomes the typical form of production."

For that purpose, many legal, political, religious and technical restrictions imposed on trade must be overcome. The unification of a "home market" among people in a country who speak the same language typically stimulated nationalist ideologies. But depending on the existing social systems, the transformation might occur in many different ways. Typically, though, it has involved wars, violence and revolutions, since people were unwilling to just give away assets, rights and income that they previously had. Communally owned property, inherited plots of land, the property of religious orders and state property had to be privatised and amalgamated, in order to become tradeable assets in the process of capital accumulation. The ideology of the rising bourgeoisie typically emphasized the benefits of privately owned property for the purpose of wealth creation and industriousness.

Marx refers to this process as the primitive accumulation of capital, a process which continues particularly in developing countries to this day. Typically, previously independent producers on the land are proletarianised and migrate to the urban centres, in search of work from an employer.

Simple commodity production nevertheless continues to occur on a large scale in the world economy, particularly in peasant production. It also persists within industrialised capitalist economies in the form of self-employment by free producers. Capitalist firms sometimes contract out specialised services to self-employed producers, who can produce them at a lower cost, or provide a superior product.

Marxian economics 
In Marxian political economy, simple commodity production also refers to a hypothetical economy used to interpret some of Karl Marx's insights about the economic laws governing the development of commodity trade: it refers to a market economy in which all producers own the resources (including the ability to work) that they use in production. No-one is a proletarian, selling his or her labor power to another. Instead, each is self-employed.

In this imaginary model, there is a direct correspondence between prices and the values of commodities. The model is imaginary, because no such society has ever existed in history; simple commodity production has always combined with some other modes of production, and as soon as a market economy reaches any size, it begins to utilise wage labor in production, and falls under the sway of the laws of capital accumulation.

Notes

References 
 Frederick Engels, Afterword to Vol. 3 of Das Kapital.
 Ian Wright, "The Emergence of the law of value in a dynamic simple commodity economy", to appear in Review of Political Economy. https://web.archive.org/web/20051105080343/http://65.254.51.50/~wright/sce.pdf
 Ronald Meek, Studies in the Labour Theory of Value. New York: Monthly Review Press, 1975.
 Tom Brass and Marcel Van Der Linden (eds.), Free and Unfree Labour: The Debate Continues (International and Comparative Social History, 5). New York: Peter Lang AG, 1997.
 Arthur Diquattro, "The Labor Theory of Value and Simple Commodity Production". Science & Society, Vol. 71, No. 4, October 2007, 455–483.
 Christopher J. Arthur, "The Myth of ‘Simple Commodity Production’", 2005, in Marx Myths and Legends, https://www.marxists.org/subject/marxmyths/chris-arthur/article2.htm

Marxist theory